George Brainerd Wellington (November 14, 1856 – January 31, 1921) was an American lawyer and politician from New York.

Life
George B. Wellington was born in Troy, New York on November 14, 1856. He graduated from Rensselaer Polytechnic Institute in 1875; from Williams College in 1876; and from Albany Law School in 1878. He practiced law in Troy, for a time in partnership with Frank S. Black. In 1880, Wellington married Harriet Townsend (died 1940), and they had five children. He was an Assistant U.S. Attorney from 1887 to 1888; and Corporation Counsel of the City of Troy from 1906 to 1912.

Wellington was a member of the New York State Senate (29th D.) from 1916 to 1918, sitting in the 139th, 140th and 141st New York State Legislatures. In November 1918, he was defeated for re-election by Democrat John J. Mackrell.

In January 1921, he underwent an operation in Albany Hospital, and died a few days later, on January 31, at his home in Troy, New York.

References

 New York Red Book (1917; pg. 130)
 Has a Plan to Kill Invisible Government in NYT on March 19, 1916 [with portrait]
 REPUBLICANS' LEAD CUT IN LEGISLATURE in NYT on November 7, 1918
 Obituary Notes; Former State Senator GEORGE BRAINERD WELLINGTON... in NYT on January 31, 1921

1856 births
1921 deaths
Republican Party New York (state) state senators
Politicians from Troy, New York
Rensselaer Polytechnic Institute alumni
Williams College alumni
Albany Law School alumni